Podturn pri Dolenjskih Toplicah is a village in the Municipality of Dolenjske Toplice in Slovenia. The area is part of the historical region of Lower Carniola. The municipality is now included in the Southeast Slovenia Statistical Region.

Name
The name of the settlement was changed from Podturn to Podturn pri Dolenjskih Toplicah in 1953.

Church
The local church is dedicated to Saint Nicholas and belongs to the Parish of Toplice. It dates to the mid-17th century.

References

External links

Podturn pri Dolenjskih Toplicah on Geopedia

Populated places in the Municipality of Dolenjske Toplice